The All Blacks first played against Italy at the opening game of the inaugural Rugby World Cup in 1987, beating them 70-6 at Eden Park, Auckland. The two teams have played a total of fifteen Test matches recognised by both sides as full internationals, with New Zealand winning all of them by an average margin of 51 points.

The two sides have been in the same pool in five of the eight Rugby World Cup tournaments to date but have only played each other four times because Typhoon Hagibis caused their scheduled meeting in the 2019 tournament to be cancelled. The first 11 meetings between the two sides since their first clash in 1987 were never played at the same venue, then two tests had been held back to back at the Stadio Olimpico in Rome.

Summary
Note: Summary below reflects test results by both teams.

Overall

Records
Note: Date shown in brackets indicates when the record was or last set.

Results

Notes 
The 2019 Rugby World Cup match between the two sides was cancelled due to Typhoon Hagibis and awarded in the tournament as a 0–0 draw.

XV Results
Below is a match that Italy has awarded test match status by virtue of awarding caps, but New Zealand did not award caps.

References

 Pick and Go Test Match Results Database

New Zealand national rugby union team matches
Italy national rugby union team matches